UAAP Season 70 was the 2007-08 season of the University Athletic Association of the Philippines, which was hosted by the University of Santo Tomas. The theme of season 70 was "Winners All, Recreating the Value of Honesty through Sports" It opened on July 7, 2007 at the Araneta Coliseum. De La Salle University returned to active participation after being suspended in Season 69.

Basketball

The UAAP Season 70 basketball tournament began on July 7, 2007 at the Araneta Coliseum in Cubao, Quezon City. The tournament host was University of Santo Tomas and tournament commissioner was Edgardo "Ed" Cordero.

Men's basketball games were held at the Ninoy Aquino Stadium, the Cuneta Astrodome and the Araneta Coliseum. The women's and juniors' games were held at the school gyms of Adamson University, Ateneo de Manila University and Far Eastern University.

Seniors division

Men's tournament

Elimination round

Team standings

Playoffs

Awardees
 Most Valuable Player (Finals): JV Casio and Cholo Villanueva (La Salle; co-awardees)
 Most Valuable Player (Season): Jervy Cruz (UST)
 Rookie of the Year: JR Cawaling (FEU).

Women's tournament

Elimination round

Playoffs

Awardees
 Most Valuable Player (Finals):
 Most Valuable Player (Season):
 Rookie of the Year:

Juniors division

Boys' tournament

Elimination round

Playoffs

Awardees
 Most Valuable Player (Season): Samuel Marata (UPIS)
 Rookie of the Year: Dave Kurt De Guzman (UE)

Football

The UAAP Football tournament officially opened on January 12, 2008 at the Ateneo Erenchun Football Field of the Ateneo de Manila University in Katipunan Avenue, Loyola Heights Quezon City. Tournament host was Ateneo de Manila.

This year marked the introduction of high school football in the UAAP as a demonstration sport. The initial participating schools were Ateneo de Manila University, De La Salle-Santiago Zobel School, University of Santo Tomas High School and FEU - Diliman.

Three championship titles are disputed in UAAP football, one for each division, namely the men's, women's and juniors. The tournament is a double round robin elimination. A Team that sweeps both rounds automatically wins the championship. Otherwise, the number one and two ranked teams meet in the Finals round with the former having a twice-to-beat advantage over the number two team. Games in the Finals go into extra time if the score is a draw at the end of Regulation Time. The extra time consists of two 15-minute periods. If there is still no winner after the extra time, then the game will go to a penalty shootout (free kick) to decide the winner.

Seniors division

Men's tournament
Elimination round

Women's tournament
Elimination round

Juniors division

Boys' tournament
Elimination round

Volleyball

The UAAP volleyball tournament opened on December 1, 2007 at the Blue Eagle Gym hosted by University of the Philippines. The Ateneo de Manila University Men's Volleyball Team took on University of the East Men's Volleyball as the opening game for the Season.

Men's volleyball games were mostly held at the Blue Eagle Gym and some at the Rizal Memorial Coliseum. Women's volleyball action meanwhile had its opening games at the Blue Eagle Gym and  transferred to Ninoy Aquino Stadium in the succeeding games. The boys' and Girls' volleyball games were mostly held at the University of the East Gymnasium with some games held at the University of the Philippines College of Human Kinetics Gym.

Men's tournament

Elimination round

Playoffs

Women's tournament
All the won games of De La Salle from January 15, 2008 up to the time it was discovered that one of its players, Jacqueline Alarca, continued playing despite her being on leave of absence were forfeited. The UAAP rule requires a player to be enrolled while playing.

Elimination round

The three-way tie for #1 was broken as follows:
 Teams were seeded by the number of sets won ratio. Adamson held the advantage with a +2, while UST and FEU had each a –1.
 In the playoffs for the first seed, Adamson with a better win record drew a bye and waited for the winner of the UST versus FEU match.
 FEU defeated UST in 4 sets and gained the right to play Adamson for the number one seeding. UST was relegated to #3 seed.
 Adamson defeated FEU in 5 sets in their playoff for the first seed.

Playoffs

Boys' tournament

Elimination round

UE's 8–0 sweep: awards them the title outright.

Girls' tournament

Elimination round

UST's 6–0 sweep: awards them the title outright.

Beach Volleyball
The UAAP Beach Volleyball tournament started on September 8, 2007 at the University of the East Caloocan sand courts in Caloocan, Metro Manila.

Men's tournament
Team standings
*Clinched twice-to-beat advantage.

Awards
 Most Valuable Player:
 Rookie of the Year:

Women's tournament
Team standings
*Clinched twice-to-beat advantage.

Awards
 Most Valuable Player: Wendy Ann Semana (FEU)
 Rookie of the Year: Shaira Gonzalez (FEU)

Softball
The UAAP Softball tournament opened July 12, 2007. Games were played at the UST Open Field.

University of the Philippines Lady Maroons clinched the title automatically after sweeping the elimination round.

Elimination round

Chess
Three championship titles were disputed in the UAAP Chess tournament.

Seniors division

Men's tournament
Team standings

Women's tournament
Team standings

Juniors division

Boys' tournament
Team standings

Taekwondo
The UAAP Taekwondo tournament started on September 15, 2007 at the University of Santo Tomas Gym in España Boulevard, Sampaloc, Manila.

Seniors division

Men's tournament
Team standings

Women's tournament
Team standings

Juniors division

Boys' tournament
Team standings

Table Tennis
The UAAP Table Tennis tournament started on September 18, 2007 at the Ateneo de Manila University Blue Eagle Gym in Katipunan Avenue, Loyola Heights, Quezon City.

Seniors division

Men's tournament
Team standings

Women's tournament
Team standings

Juniors division

Boys' tournament
Team standings

Swimming
The UAAP Season 70 Swimming Championships was held on September 20–23, 2007 at the Trace Aquatics Centre in Los Baños, Laguna.

Team ranking is determined by a point system, similar to that of the overall championship. The points given are based on the swimmer's/team's finish in the finals of an event, which include only the top eight finishers from the preliminaries. The gold medalist(s) receive 15 points, silver gets 12, bronze has 10. The following points: 8, 6, 4, 2 and 1 are given to the rest of the participating swimmers/teams according to their order of finish.

Seniors division

Men's tournament

Women's tournament

Juniors division

Boys' tournament

Girls' tournament

Judo

The UAAP Judo tournament started on October 6, 2007 and ended on October 7, 2007 at the Blue Eagle Gym of the Ateneo de Manila University in Katipunan Avenue, Loyola Heights, Quezon City.

Seniors division

Men's tournament

Women's tournament

Juniors division

Boys' tournament

Cheerdance

The 2007 Cheerdance Competition was held on September 16, 2007 at the Araneta Coliseum, Araneta Center, Cubao, Quezon City. Cheer dance competition is an exhibition event. Points for the general championship are not awarded to the participants.

The UP Pep Squad clinched their fourth UAAP cheerdance title after 5 years. UST settled for second place, and the third place went to FEU.

General championship summary 
The general champion is determined by a point system. The system gives 15 points to the champion team of a UAAP event, 12 to the runner-up, and 10 to the third placer. The following points: 8, 6, 4, 2 and 1 are given to the rest of the participating teams according to their order of finish.

Medals table

Seniors' division

Juniors' division

General championship tally

Seniors' division

Juniors' division

Individual awards
Athletes of the Year:
 Seniors': 
 Juniors':

See also
NCAA Season 83

References

 
2007 in multi-sport events
2007 in Philippine sport
2008 in multi-sport events
2008 in Philippine sport
70